Davide Seminara (born 5 July 1998) is an Italian football player. He plays for Matelica.

Club career

Empoli
Seminara is a product of Empoli youth teams. He made one bench appearance for the senior squad in December 2016 in a match against Atalanta.

Loan to Prato
On 27 July 2018, Seminara joined Serie C club Prato on a season-long loan. On 5 November he made his professional debut in Serie C for Prato as a substitute replacing Andrea Badan after an hour of play against Piacenza. On 26 November he played his first match as a starter for Prato, a 1–0 home win over Olbia, he was replaced by Andrea Badan after 68 minutes. Two weeks later, on 10 December, he played his first and only entire match for Prato, a 1–0 home defeat against Pontedera. On 21 January 2018, Seminara scored his first professional goal in the 21st minute of a 2–0 home win over Cuneo. Seminara ended his season-long loan to Prato with 20 appearances and one goal, however the club was relegated to Serie D.

Loan to Reggina
On 11 July 2018, Seminara joined another Serie C club Reggina for the entire 2018–19 season. Almost five months later, on 2 December, he made his Serie C debut for Reggina in a 3–2 home win over Rieti, he was replaced by Leonardo Mastrippolito in the 55th minute. One week later, on 9 December, Seminara played his first entire match for the club, a 2–1 away win over Sicula Leonzio. Seminara ended his season-long loan to Reggina with only 8 appearances, including 7 as a starter, however he played only one entire match and remaining an unused substitute for 17 other matches.

Pianese 
On 29 July 2019, Seminara joined to newly promoted Serie C club Pianese on an undisclosed fee. On 25 August he made his debut for the club as a substitute replacing Emilio Dierna in the 67th minute of a 2–0 away defeat against Pro Vercelli. Six days later, on 31 August he played his first match as a starter for the club, a 1–0 home win over Arezzo, he was replaced by Simone Ambrogio after 76 minutes. Eight days later, on 8 September Seminara played his first entire match for Pianese, a 4–0 away win over Giana Erminio. At the end of the season the club relegated to Serie D after losing the play-out matches against Pergolettese.

Matelica 
On 12 August 2020, Seminara joined to newly promoted Serie C side Matelica for an undisclosed fee. On 23 September 2020, before the season started, he suffered an ACL injury in his left knee and was expected to not play in the 2020–21 season. He recovered to make Matelica debut in the last game of the 2020–21 regular season.

Career statistics

Club

References

External links
 

1998 births
Sportspeople from Livorno
Living people
Italian footballers
Association football defenders
Empoli F.C. players
A.C. Prato players
Reggina 1914 players
S.S. Matelica Calcio 1921 players
Serie C players
Footballers from Tuscany